Mark 3 torpedo may refer to:

 Whitehead Mark 3 torpedo
 Bliss-Leavitt Mark 3 torpedo